Hamilton v. Alabama, 368 U.S. 52 (1961), was a case heard by the Supreme Court of the United States. Hamilton was charged in an Alabama court with breaking and entering a dwelling at night with intent to ravish, and had pleaded not guilty. He had then been convicted and sentenced to death. The Court ruled unanimously that the absence of counsel at the time of his arraignment violated Hamilton's due process rights under the Fourteenth Amendment.

See also
List of United States Supreme Court cases, volume 368
Alabama State Mercenaries

External links
 
 

United States Supreme Court cases
United States Supreme Court cases of the Warren Court
United States Sixth Amendment appointment of counsel case law
1961 in United States case law
Legal history of Alabama
1961 in Alabama